Kim Brooks is a university professor and administrator who currently serves as the Dean of the Faculty of Management at Dalhousie University. Previously, she served as the Dean of the university's Schulich School of Law and as the endowed H. Heward Stikeman Chair in Law of Taxation at the McGill University Faculty of Law. On January 1, 2023 Brooks will become the acting Provost and Vice-President Academic of Dalhousie University.

Education
Kim Brooks received her BA from the University of Toronto, an LLB the University of British Columbia, LLM from Osgoode Hall Law School at York University. In between her law degree and LLM, she worked as a tax lawyer with the firm Stikeman Elliott.

Academic career
Kim Brooks began her career as a law professor at Queen's University and the University of British Columbia. She then became a professor of law at McGill University, where she was a recipient of the 3M Teaching Fellowship. At McGill she was appointed to the H. Heward Stikeman Chair in Law of Taxation. Her research focus is on tax law, and she has also been an advocate for university community inclusiveness. Brooks served as the Dean of the Schulich School of Law at Dalhousie, before becoming Dean of the Dalhousie University's Faculty of Management. She is also a past-President of the Canadian Association of Law Teachers.

Government work
In 2016 Brooks was brought in by the Revenue Minister of the Government of Canada to act as an independent reviewer of accused tax malfeasance of KPMG advisors and the handling of the file by the Canada Revenue Agency. Following her review, she was appointed as the vice chair of the agency's offshore advisory committee.

References

Academic staff of the Dalhousie University
Academic staff of the McGill University Faculty of Law
Osgoode Hall Law School alumni
University of Toronto alumni
Peter A. Allard School of Law alumni
Year of birth missing (living people)
Living people